Richard A. Chaifetz (born August 1953) is an American billionaire businessman, investor, licensed neuropsychologist, and philanthropist. He is the founder, chairman, and chief executive officer of Chicago-based ComPsych Corporation, the world's largest provider of employee assistance programs. He is also the founder of the Chaifetz Group, a private investment firm focusing on venture capital, growth, and opportunistic investment strategies. He appears regularly in The Wall Street Journal, USA Today, Bloomberg Businessweek, and Time. He has been listed in the Crain’s Chicago Business annual Who's Who list annually since 2004. He is the naming donor of Saint Louis University's Richard A. Chaifetz School of Business, Chaifetz Arena, and Chaifetz Center for Entrepreneurship.

Chaifetz is a Saint Louis University Alumnus of the Year, and was inducted into the university’s Entrepreneurial Alumni Hall of Fame in 2007. Chaifetz Arena, located on the campus of Saint Louis University, was named after him following his $12 million donation to the university. In February 2018, Chaifetz donated another $15 million to Saint Louis University, bringing his total contribution to $27 million. The university has named the business school after him, the Richard A. Chaifetz School of Business, as well as the entrepreneurship center as the Chaifetz Center for Entrepreneurship, in recognition of his gift.   His donations to Miami University funded the creation of the Chaifetz Trading Center at the school’s Farmer School of Business.

Early life
Chaifetz was born in 1953 and is the oldest of four children. His parents divorced when he was 13. The family lived in Long Island, New York on his mother’s school teacher salary. Chaifetz went to Eastern Military Academy, an ROTC high school in Long Island.

Chaifetz was motivated to achieve early success after watching his mother struggle to raise four children after the divorce. At Eastern Military Academy he was a lacrosse player and one of two cadets from his class to receive appointments to the United States Military Academy at West Point, New York. He declined the appointment, choosing instead to attend Saint Louis University. During Chaifetz’s second semester of his freshman year of college, his father, with whom he had limited contact, suddenly stopped paying his tuition. Richard pleaded with the university’s president to remain in school. He said that if the university allowed him to stay, he would repay his tuition and "pay back the university in an even bigger way as soon as he became successful." Chaifetz was allowed to stay and worked a variety of jobs in order to meet his tuition obligations. He graduated magna cum laude with a degree in psychology in 1975. He received his doctorate from the Illinois School of Professional Psychology in 1981.

Career
Chaifetz founded ComPsych Corporation, now the world's largest provider of employee assistance programs (EAPs), in 1984. Prior to that and immediately after graduation, he opened more than a dozen outpatient and inpatient treating centers serving the general public for the full range of mental health issues. As he expanded the centers with the goal of franchising the operation, he saw the market change from direct insurance reimbursement to an HMO model, prompting him to significantly change the focus of the business. ComPsych then began providing psychological services directly to employers on a capitation fee basis.

In addition to EAP services, ComPsych began to expand its offerings over the years to include work-life services, legal and financial resources, behavioral health and outsourced HR services. By 2012 ComPsych was serving more than 17,000 organizations and 45 million individuals worldwide. By 2018, the company reportedly covered more than 100 million workers in 160 countries and more than 45,000 employers.

In 2011, Chaifetz launched and became the founding chairman of the Chaifetz Group, a venture capital and private equity firm focusing on venture capital and growth investing. In 2014, The Chaifetz Group invested in Pixel Press, a St. Louis-based company that allows users to turn drawings into video games. Additional Chaifetz Group investment holdings include Fooda, Cargo, 15Five, ParkWhiz (now Arrive), Repurpose, Factor 75, BacklotCars and SaveWave Energy.

He is a member of The Economic Club of Chicago, and The Executives’ Club of Chicago. He has served on the board of directors of several public and private corporations including Pixel Press, Kennet Partners, Access MediQuip, Trading Partners Holdings, Amerihost Properties, and NueVista Holdings. He also serves on the boards of non-profit organizations including The Field Museum of Natural History Board of Trustees, the Miami University Farmer School of Business, Saint Louis University Board of Trustees, the Illinois Holocaust Museum, the Brain Research Foundation and TCS Education System.

Philanthropy
Chaifetz donated $12 million to Saint Louis University in 2007. The donation was the lead gift used to build Chaifetz Arena, an $80 million 10,600-seat sports facility which houses the university’s men’s and women’s basketball teams. Chaifetz was named Saint Louis University’s Alumni of the Year and was inducted into the University’s Entrepreneurial Alumni Hall of Fame later that year.

Chaifetz and his wife Jill donated $3 million to Miami University in November 2007. The donation funded the Chaifetz Trading Center at the Miami University's Farmer School of Business. The Chaifetzes also donated to the Field Museum of Natural History in 2008. The amount of the donation was not released to the public, but the couple is listed among donors giving $1 million to $2 million in the museum’s 2008 annual report.

Chaifetz was awarded the 2014 Frederic A. Gibbs Discovery Award in Philanthropy by the Brain Research Foundation.

In 2017, he was given the Humanitarian Award from the Illinois Holocaust Museum and Education Center, honoring his contribution to society through his business endeavors and his philanthropic activities.

In February 2018, Chaifetz donated another $15 million to Saint Louis University. The university has now named the business school after him, the Richard A. Chaifetz School of Business as well as the entrepreneurship center as the Chaifetz Center for Entrepreneurship.

Sports
Chaifetz has been linked to attempts to buy multiple professional sports franchises. He was named as a potential buyer of the St. Louis Rams professional football team in 2010. The Rams were eventually sold to Stan Kroenke in August of that year.

In 2014, Chaifetz was an interested party to purchase the Milwaukee Bucks professional basketball team. Reportedly, Chaifetz became interested in the franchise due to his longtime friendship with basketball coach and Wisconsin native Rick Majerus, who had been the head coach of the Saint Louis University men’s basketball team in 2007 when Chaifetz donated $12 million to help build the team’s new arena. Chaifetz was also involved in a bid to acquire an additional unnamed National Basketball Association team, according to the Chicago Tribune in 2012.

In July 2017, it was reported that billionaire Chaifetz had backed out of a bid for MLB's Miami Marlins which included Derek Jeter. Chaifetz, who was reported to contribute "multiple-hundreds of millions of dollars" to the group's bid, was uncomfortable with Jeter seeking a leadership role with the team while not investing much of his own capital.

In 2022, Chaifetz Group announced an investment in Team Liquid, a global esports organization. Team Liquid is the winningest and most watched esports team of all team, holding claim to 120+ major gaming tournament Championships and the most prize money earned in esports history.

In early 2023, the Chaifetz family announced that it had acquired a team franchise in Major League Pickleball. The franchise, introduced as the St. Louis Shock, is owned by Chaifetz with its operations and management overseen by Chaifetz’ family, led by his son Ross Chaifetz. Other prominent MLP owners include billionaire business leaders, athletes, and celebrities including Mark Cuban, Marc Lasry, LeBron James, Kevin Durant, Tom Brady, Kygo, Kate Upton, Patrick Mahomes, Heidi Klum and more.

References

External links
ComPsych website

Living people
1957 births
Saint Louis University alumni
People from Brooklyn
Philanthropists from New York (state)